The slug is a derived unit of mass in a weight-based system of measures, most notably within the British Imperial measurement system and the United States customary measures system. Systems of measure either define mass and derive a force unit or define a base force and derive a mass unit (cf. poundal, a derived unit of force in a force-based system). A slug is defined as the mass that is accelerated by 1 ft/s2 when a net force of one pound (lbf) is exerted on it.

One slug is a mass equal to  based on standard gravity, the international foot, and the avoirdupois pound.

History 
The slug is part of a subset of units known as the gravitational FPS system, one of several such specialized systems of mechanical units developed in the late 19th and the 20th century. Geepound was another name for this unit in early literature.

The name "slug" was coined before 1900 by British physicist Arthur Mason Worthington, but it did not see any significant use until decades later. It is derived from the meaning "solid block of metal" (cf. "slug" fake coin or "slug" projectile), not from the slug mollusc. A 1928 textbook says:

The slug is listed in the Regulations under the Weights and Measures (National Standards) Act, 1960. This regulation defines the units of weights and measures, both regular and metric, in Australia.

Related units 
This unit is also called slinch (a portmanteau of the words slug and inch). Similar terms include slugette and snail.

Similar (but long-obsolete) metric units included the glug (980.665 g) in the centimetre–gram–second system, and the mug, hyl, par, or TME (9.80665 kg) in the metre–kilogram–second system.

See also
 British Engineering Units

References

External links
 "What is a Slug?" on phy-astr.gsu.edu

Imperial units
Units of mass
Customary units of measurement in the United States